154 is the third album by the English post-punk band Wire, released in 1979 
on EMI imprint Harvest Records in the UK and Europe and Warner Bros. Records in America.

Music
Branching out even further from the minimalist punk rock style of their earlier work, 154 is considered a progression of the sounds displayed on Wire's previous album Chairs Missing, with the group experimenting with slower tempos, fuller song structures and a more prominent use of guitar effects, synthesizers and electronics.

The unusual title of the track "Map Ref 41°N 93°W" was based on a guess of the centre of the American Midwest by bassist and singer Graham Lewis; the location of these coordinates is coincidentally close to Centerville, Iowa. One of My Bloody Valentine's last releases prior to reconvening in 2007 was a cover of this track for a Wire tribute entitled Whore. The song was selected as a favourite cover of the 1990s by Flak Magazine.

Reception
154 peaked at number 39 in the UK Albums Chart, the highest position the band has achieved. It was first issued on CD in 1987 by EMI Japan and later reissued by Restless Records in 1989. First editions of the vinyl album were accompanied by an EP, the tracks from which are included on the Harvest CD, issued in 1994, along with an additional bonus track. The new remastered release, released by Pinkflag as digipacks in 2006, does not contain any extra tracks, because, according to the band, such additions dishonour the "conceptual clarity of the original statements." The album is so named because the band had played 154 gigs in their career at the time of the album's release. In 2004, Pitchfork listed 154 as 85th best album of the 1970s.

Track listing
Credits adapted from the 2018 Special Edition.

Tracks 19–24 are demo versions that have also appeared on compilations such as Behind the Curtain and After Midnight.

2018 Special Edition

Personnel
Credits adapted from the liner notes of the 2018 Special Edition.

Wire
 Colin Newman – vocals, guitar, backing vocals, distorted bass on "On Returning"
 Graham Lewis – bass, vocals on "I Should Have Known Better", "A Touching Display" and "Blessed State", backing vocals, percussion on "Once Is Enough", sleeve concept
 B. C. Gilbert – guitar, spoken word on "The Other Window", sleeve concept
 Robert Gotobed – drums, percussion

Additional personnel and production
 Kate Lukas – alto flute on "Single K.O."
 Tim Souster – electric viola on "A Touching Display"
 Hilly Kristal – bass vocals on "A Mutual Friend"
 Joan Whiting – cor anglais on "A Mutual Friend"
 Mike Thorne – production, synthesizer, piano on "Single K.O."
 Paul Hardiman – engineer
 Ken Thomas – assistant engineer
 Dave Dragon – art direction
 Brian Harris – typographic design

Bonus tracks
 Colin Newman – vocals, guitar, syndrum on "Go Ahead", saxophone on "Former Airline", keyboards on "Midnight Bahnhof Cafe", production on "Get Down (Parts I + II)"
 Graham Lewis – bass, keyboards on "Go Ahead", saxophone on "Former Airline", vocals and production on "Let's Panic Later"
 B. C. Gilbert – guitar, bass on "Go Ahead", saxophone on "Former Airline", production on "Small Electric Piece"
 Robert Gotobed – drums, production on "Song 1" 
 Mike Thorne – production on "A Question of Degree" and "Former Airline"
 Paul Hardiman – engineer on "A Question of Degree" and "Former Airline"
 Ken Thomas – assistant engineer on "A Question of Degree" and "Former Airline"
 Wire – production on "Go Ahead", "Our Swimmer", "Midnight Bahnhof Cafe", "Our Swimmer (2nd Length)", "Catapult 30" and the sixth demo sessions
 Nick Glennie-Smith – engineer on 154 EP and the sixth demo sessions
 Daniel Priest – engineer on "Go Ahead", "Our Swimmer" and "Midnight Bahnhof Cafe"
 Steve Parker – engineer on "Our Swimmer (2nd Length)" and "Catapult 30"
 "A Question of Degree" and "Former Airline" recorded and mixed April 1979 at Advision Studios, London 
 154 bonus EP recorded and mixed July 1979 at Riverside Studios, London
 "Go Ahead", "Our Swimmer" and "Midnight Bahnhof Cafe" recorded and mixed November 1979 at Magritte Studios, Middlesex 
 "2nd Length (Our Swimmer)" and "Catapult 30" recorded and mixed 1980 at Scorpio Sound, London

References

Informational notes

External links
 
 
 The making of Wire's 154 album
 Accolades archived at Acclaimed Music

1979 albums
Wire (band) albums
Harvest Records albums
Warner Records albums
Restless Records albums
Albums produced by Mike Thorne
Avant-pop albums